Kyai Haji Hasyim Asy'ari (14 February 1871 or 10 April 1875 – 25 July 1947) was an Indonesian ulama, National Hero and founder of Nahdlatul Ulama.

Biography
Hasyim Asy'ari was born Muhammad Hasyim in Gedang, Jombang Regency on 10 April 1875. His parents were Asy'ari and Halimah. His grandfather, Kiai Usman was the founder of Pesantren Gedang and his great grandfather was the founder of Pesantren Tambakberas. He was the third son of ten siblings.

Hasyim Asy'ari's ancestry can be traced to Sultan Hadiwijaya of Pajang, and further, to Brawijaya VI (Girindrawardhana), the last king of Majapahit.

At the age of twenty, he married Khadijah, daughter of Pesantren Siwalan Panji leader. One year later, they went to Mecca. After seven months, his wife was dead and also his son, Abdullah two months later.

In 1899, he founded Pesantren Tebuireng, which later became the largest pesantren in Java in the early 20th century having four thousands students in 1947. The pesantren also became the center for the reform of traditional Islamic teaching.

On 31 January 1926, he and several traditional Islamic leaders founded Nahdlatul Ulama (Awakening of Ulamas). During the Japanese occupation era, he was arrested, several months later he was released and became Head of Religious Affairs.

He died suddenly on 25 July 1947 due to hypertension, after hearing news that Dutch troops were winning a battle in Malang.

Personal life
He married seven times and all of his wives were daughters of ulama. Four of his wives were Khadijah, Nafisah, Nafiqah and Masrurah. One of his sons, Wahid Hasyim was one of the formulators of the  Jakarta Charter and later became Minister of Religious Affairs, while his grandson Abdurrahman Wahid became President of Indonesia.

References

Bibliography
 

1875 births
1947 deaths
Indonesian collaborators with Imperial Japan
Indonesian Sunni Muslims
Nahdlatul Ulama
National Heroes of Indonesia
People from Jombang Regency
Wahid family